Napoleon Bonaparte McCanless House is a historic home located at Salisbury, Rowan County, North Carolina.  It is a three-story, three bay by four bay, Second Empire style dwelling faced with rusticated granite.  It has a rounded corner tower and a steep, concave, mansard roof sheathed in decorative slate shingles.  Also on the property is a one-story, granite-veneered brick outbuilding believed to have been the kitchen.

Napoleon B. McCanless served as president of the Halifax Cotton Mill Company, and held interests in agriculture, manufacturing, and mining. His home was added to the National Register of Historic Places in 2014. Some projects he was involved with include Vance Cotton Mill, Kesler Cotton Mill, North Side Cotton Mill, the Doggin (or Coggin) Mines Co., Yadkin Finishing Co. and Harris Granite Co. In the area of banking, Salisbury Savings Bank, Peoples National Bank (later Security Bank and Trust). He was also involved with the Washington Building, Central Hotel and the Empire  Hotel.

In June 2019, Historic Salisbury Foundation purchased the house for $160,000 from Livingstone College, which had once planned to use the house for a culinary school later housed at a former Holiday Inn. It was one of four remaining significant houses on South Main Street. While the house had been restored for a restaurant, it was in bad shape and cleanup work would take place before another restoration.

In January 2021, Historic Salisbury Foundation, Inc. entered into a three-year partnership with The Ghost Guild, Inc. to explore reports of unexplained activity in and around the property. The Ghost Guild, Inc. is a registered nonprofit organization that investigates the Napoleon Bonaparte McCanless House several times per year and present its findings as part of Historic Salisbury Foundation annual October Tour.

References

Houses on the National Register of Historic Places in North Carolina
Second Empire architecture in North Carolina
Houses completed in 1897
Houses in Salisbury, North Carolina
National Register of Historic Places in Rowan County, North Carolina